A coining press is a manually operated machine that mints coins from planchets. After centuries it was replaced by more modern machines.

Presses came in multiple shapes and with different accessories (to collect the coins, etc.) They were made of cast iron. The basic elements are:

 A triumphal arch with a built-in base
 A vertically arranged leadscrew that supported an inertia wheel or more commonly, a piece made up of two radial arms with weights at the ends.
 The leadscrew (male) rotates inside a threaded (female) nut. The nut is attached to the structure. The turn of the inertia wheel (or bar with weights) determines the rotation of the thread bar and its vertical displacement (up or down depending on the direction of rotation).
 Vertical guides allow vertical displacement of the holder (upper die) without rotating.

Operation 
Each coin is formed in a single operation. The press holds two negatives (molds that show each side of the coin) The body (material from which the coin is to be formed) is placed on the lower negative and the upper negative is lowered to create pressure sufficient to emboss the negatives onto the body. The upper negative descends directly without turning, pushed by a threaded bar that rotates, turned by a lever, compensated by an anti-torsion system.  It is called a cold deformation as not heat is applied.

History 
Before the press, coins were minted with a hammer:

Gallery

References

Bibliography

Numismatic terminology
Currency production